Peregrina may refer to:
 Jatropha integerrima, commonly known as peregrina, a species of flowering plant in the spurge family, Euphorbiaceae
 Peregrina (Venezuelan TV series), a 1973 Venezuelan telenovela
 Peregrina (Mexican TV series), a 2005 Mexican telenovela
 Peregrina (film), a 1951 Mexican film
 "Peregrina", a song commissioned by Felipe Carrillo Puerto

See also 
 La Peregrina, a pearl